McKinzie is a surname. Notable people with the surname include:

Barbara McKinzie, American accountant
Edith Kawelohea McKinzie, Hawaiian genealogist, writer, and hula expert
Ralph McKinzie (1894–1990), American football, baseball and basketball coach

See also
McKinzie Islands, islands of Antarctica
Ralph McKinzie Field, a baseball venue in DeKalb, Illinois
 McKinzie - a thoroughbred racehorse